Brian Jacobs is an American actor, who has appeared extensively on television shows and national commercials. Originally from New York City, he now resides in Los Angeles.

Career 
He is known for his starring role on The Mr. Potato Head Show, as well as guest starring on Star Trek, Lincoln Heights, LAX (with Heather Locklear), Will & Grace, Sabrina the Teenage Witch, Sunset Beach, Time of Your Life, The Nightmare Room, Martial Law, 3rd Rock From the Sun, and for comedy skits on The Tonight Show. Film appearances include The Golden Age, Woke, The Last Spin, Amazon Warrior, and Ghost World.

Filmography

Film

Television

References

External links

Male actors from New York City
Male actors from Los Angeles
Living people
Year of birth missing (living people)